Van Reeth may refer to:

Bob Van Reeth (born 1943), Belgian architect
Van Reeth Glacier, glacier in Antarctica